The 2022 Troy Trojans softball team represented Troy University during the 2022 NCAA Division I softball season. The Trojans played their home games at Troy Softball Complex. The Trojans were led by eighth-year head coach Beth Mullins until she resigned due to health conditions on March 14, 2022. Assistant coaches Taylor Smartt and Holly Ward served as interim Co-Head Coaches for the remainder of the season.  They were members of the Sun Belt Conference.

Preseason

Sun Belt Conference Coaches Poll
The Sun Belt Conference Coaches Poll was released on January 31, 2022. Troy was picked to finish third in the conference with 82 votes and 1 first place vote.

Preseason All-Sun Belt team

Preseason Pitcher of the Year
Leanna Johnson (TROY, Pitcher)

Team
Olivia Lackie (USA, Pitcher)
Leanna Johnson (TROY, Pitcher)
Kandra Lamb (LA, Pitcher)
Jessica Mullins (TXST, Pitcher)
Kamdyn Kvistad (USA, Catcher)
Sophie Piskos (LA, Catcher)
Faith Shirley (GASO, 1st Base)
Kelly Horne (TROY, 2nd Base)
Daisy Hess (GSU, Shortstop)
Sara Vanderford (TXST, 3rd Base)
Iyanla De Jesus (CCU, Designated Player)
Raina O'Neal (LA, Outfielder)
Mackenzie Brasher (USA, Outfielder)
Emily Brown (GSU, Outfielder)
Jade Sinness (TROY, Outfielder)

National Softball Signing Day

Personnel

Schedule and results

Schedule Source:
*Rankings are based on the team's current ranking in the NFCA/USA Softball poll.

References

Troy
Troy Trojans softball
Troy Trojans softball seasons